The Abadi gas field is a natural gas field located in the Arafura Sea. It was discovered in 2000 and developed by and Inpex. It will begin production in 2015 and will produce natural gas and condensates. The total proven reserves of the Abadi gas field are around 10 trillion cubic feet (242×109m³), and production is slated to be around 974 million cubic feet/day (27.4×105m³) in 2015.

See also
 List of gas fields in Indonesia

References

Natural gas fields in Indonesia